Roman Bridge railway station is a request stop passenger station in the Lledr Valley, Wales, on the Conwy Valley Line from Llandudno Junction to Blaenau Ffestiniog, which is operated by Transport for Wales Rail. 

The station is unmanned and does not serve a village. It is named after a nearby ancient bridge over the River Lledr, that carries a minor highway from the A470 road to scattered hill farms at Blaenau Dolwyddelan.

History
Early Baedeker guide books to Great Britain state that there is no explanation for the name, though the Roman road Sarn Helen is known to have passed down the valley on its way from Canovium (in the Conwy Valley) to Tomen y Mur, at Trawsfynydd making a crossing at this point feasible.

The station was host to two LMS caravans from 1935 to 1939. A camping coach was also positioned here by the London Midland Region from 1954 to 1956.

The station building still stands and is well maintained as a residence - it was offered for sale in 2013 for £450,000 as a private home (with 10 acres of land), after previous use as a holiday cottage.

Facilities
The unstaffed station has digital CIS screens.  There is a waiting shelter, pay phone and timetable poster board for train running information provision.

Services
Five southbound and six northbound trains call on request Mondays to Saturdays (approximately every three hours), with three trains each way on Sundays between May and early September. 

Services were temporarily suspended in February 2020 and replaced by road transport due to flooding of the line north of Llanrwst caused by Storm Ciara. Following completion of the work to repair the storm damage, services at the station were reinstated on 28 September 2020.

References

Further reading

External links

Conwy Valley Railway

Dolwyddelan
Railway stations in Conwy County Borough
DfT Category F2 stations
Railway request stops in Great Britain
Former London and North Western Railway stations
Railway stations in Great Britain opened in 1879
Railway stations served by Transport for Wales Rail